Leante is a surname. Notable people with the surname include:

 John Leante (fl. 1383), English politician
 Edward Leante (fl. 1374–1380), English politician
 Luis Leante (born 1963), Spanish novelist and professor

See also
 Leanne